is a survival horror role-playing puzzle video game. The game was developed by Japanese developer Sen, published by Miscreant's Room and released on 10 December 2012. The game centers around an 11-year-old girl named Aya, who breaks into her father's secret laboratory to uncover the horrifying truth of his research. A Steam version, published by AGM Playism, was released on 23 September 2016.

Plot 

Mad Father takes place in northern Germany, where the 11-year-old protagonist Aya Drevis lives with her father Alfred and their maid Maria. Aya is a shy girl who never goes outside. Her mother, Monika Drevis, was incredibly ill, and presumably died of illness before the occurrence of the game. Her father performs secret research in his laboratory in the house's basement, with the assistance of Maria. Aya is aware that Alfred experiments on and kills humans in the basement, as well as the fact that he is involved in an extramarital affair with the younger Maria, a former homeless woman he had taken off the street some years prior.

On the anniversary of Monika's death, the very beginning of the game, Aya awakens at midnight to find herself surrounded by test subjects that escaped from the laboratory. Fleeing back into her room, Aya encounters the mysterious salesman Ogre, who offers her the task of solving puzzles to break into her father's laboratory and uncover his secret. Aya discovers that her father had intended to perform taxidermy on her and convert her into a doll, as he had done to numerous other children, having been enamored with preserving humans after having killed his own mother as a youth. Aya soon discovers that her father killed her mother in fear of her mother taking Aya away to prevent him from performing taxidermy on her.

The game has three endings based on the player's choices. In one ending, Aya allows her undead mother to take her father away to another world. After returning to the real world, she runs into Maria, who knocks her out, takes her to the basement and then kills her, turning her corpse into a doll. In the second ending, Aya saves her father from being taken by her mother's spirit. However, after doing so, Monika reveals to Aya that Alfred murdered her for one of his experiments. Horrified, Aya flees while being chased by a chainsaw-wielding Alfred. While attempting to escape, she runs into Maria. Maria attempts to follow her, but when she fails to capture her, Alfred attacks Maria. The game then branches into two endings depending on Aya's actions; if Aya neglects to help Maria and instead attempts to escape the mansion, she is found by her father and killed, with Alfred performing taxidermy on her corpse and rendering her into one of his dolls. In the true ending, Aya helps Maria, declaring that the two shall henceforth live together. Maria then kills Alfred and the two women leave the mansion, which is burned down by Robin, the spirit of one of Alfred's human test subjects.

While walking away from the burning mansion, Aya notices that her father's medical book has survived the blaze, and decides to take it with her as she and Maria start their lives anew. Meanwhile, inside the burning house, Ogre transports Alfred's spirit to another world, where he is free to experiment to his heart's content, creating a mature adult clone of his daughter, leading into the events of Misao. Some years later, Aya and Maria have created a clinic, where they perform medical services free of charge. A poor woman named Jean Rooney arrives for an examination, and Aya uses anesthesia to render Jean unconscious, claiming that Jean will no longer suffer from her illnesses. In another room, Maria muses that Aya has become just like her father and that the tendencies run in the family, heavily implying that Aya has followed in her father's footsteps.

In an extra scene at the end of the game, you can play through an ending called "if" where the player can play as Robin. It is revealed in this scene that Robin is actually a living boy, brought back to life by Monika's power.

In the Remake of the game, a new epilogue is included, with an adult Aya trapped in a nightmare version of the house. It is revealed that Aya was actually evil from the start, as she has flashbacks to hurting animals, with her father telling her to say sorry when she hurts something, leading her to say sorry even though she doesn't mean it throughout the main game. Through diary entries, journal entries, and letters scattered throughout the house, it is revealed that Monika was trying to make the perfect successor to her family's demonic tendencies and that Aya inherited her tendencies and not Alfred's. Through Monika's letters with her grandfather, it is revealed that she met Alfred in prison, and arranged to marry him and have a child when he got out, as he was a serial killer at the time, making him a perfect choice. Alfred finds out about it years later, and it leads to him planning to turn Aya into a doll with Maria, ending Monika's cursed bloodline, and Monika planning to run away with Aya, leading into the main game. Aya manages to escape the house once again and scoffs at it as it burns down, and she wakes up in her clinic, ready to start a new day.

Remake 
A remake of the game was released on November 5, 2020, for Nintendo Switch and PC via Steam.

Reception

Noisy Pixel critic Jahanzeb Khan gave Mad Father a positive review, and wrote that it is "a classic survival horror experience that hearkens to the bygone era of horror classics like Silent Hill, Alone in the Dark and even Resident Evil. Of course, Mad Father is a top-down 2D horror adventure which, whether intentionally or not, makes it a throwback to the oft-forgotten Capcom classic, Sweet Home".
Screen Rant writer Anastasia Wilds ranked it the 7th-best RPG Maker horror game, and wrote that it will "terrify gamers while also challenging them with its tough difficulty." She also wrote that there are "great twists in the narrative".

References

External links 
 

2012 video games
Freeware games
Survival video games
2010s horror video games
Puzzle video games
Role-playing video games
Video games developed in Japan
Video games featuring female protagonists
Video games set in Germany
Windows games
Nintendo Switch games
Single-player video games
Video games with alternate endings
RPG Maker games
Playism games